Richard Oliver Earnshaw (8 January 1939 – 28 July 1963) was an English first-class cricketer.

While undertaking his National Service in the Royal Electrical and Mechanical Engineers, Earnshaw played first-class cricket for the Combined Services cricket team, making his debut against the touring South Africans at Portsmouth in 1960. He made a second first-class appearance in 1961, against Northamptonshire at Northampton. He scored 11 runs across his two matches, as well as bowling 67 wicketless overs with his right-arm fast-medium bowling, conceding 211 runs.

He died at Westminster in July 1963, aged just 24.

References

External links

1939 births
1963 deaths
Cricketers from Huddersfield
Royal Electrical and Mechanical Engineers soldiers
English cricketers
Combined Services cricketers
Military personnel from Yorkshire
20th-century British Army personnel